Niklas Hoheneder (born 17 August 1986) is an Austrian football coach and a former defender. He is an assistant coach with Chemnitzer FC. He previously played for LASK Linz, Sparta Prague, Austria Wien, Karlsruher SC, RB Leipzig, SC Paderborn 07 and Holstein Kiel.

Career
Hoheneder was born in Linz, Austria. He started his career at LASK Linz and made around 120 appearances for the club between 2005 and 2009.

He joined Sparta Prague in the summer of 2009. In January 2011, Hoheneder joined Austria Wien on a half-season loan, with Wien having the option to sign him on a permanent basis. After making 6 appearances in the Austrian Bundesliga, Hohender did not join Austria Wien on a permanent basis and returned to parent club Sparta Prague.

Having made 47 appearances in all competitions for Sparta Prague, in June 2011, 2. Bundesliga side Karlsruher SC announced the signing of Hoheneder from Sparta Prague on a two-year contract. During the first half of the 2011–12 season, Hoheneder made 13 appearances in the 2. Bundesliga, though did not score.

He joined RB Leipzig on 31 January 2012 on a one-and-a-half-year contract. Hoheneder made 11 appearances for RB Leipzig during the 2011–12 season, the majority of which as a substitute, scoring once. In April 2013, he signed a two-year contract extension with RB Leipzig, keeping him at the club until 30 June 2015. Hoheneder was a regular player for RB Leipzig in the 2012–13 and the 2013–14 season, but made just 10 appearances for RB Leipzig during the 2014–15 season.

After his contract at RB Leipzig expired, Hoheneder joined SC Paderborn 07 on a two-year contract. He was a regular player at Paderborn, making 24 appearances and scoring 1 goal in the 2. Bundesliga.

In the summer of 2016, Hoheneder joined 3. Liga side Holstein Kiel on a two-year contract. He suffered a ligament injury in December 2016, being injured for around a month as a result. He made 28 appearances for Kiel in the 2016–17 season as part of the Holstein Kiel team that was promoted to the 2. Bundesliga. He made just 7 appearances during the 2017–18 season and left Kiel in the summer of 2018.

On 6 July 2018, Höheneder signed for Regionalliga Nordost club Chemnitzer FC. He made 32 appearances for Chemnitz, scoring twice, as Chemnitz were promoted to the 3. Liga.

References

External links
 
 
 
 

1986 births
Living people
Footballers from Linz
Association football defenders
Austrian footballers
LASK players
AC Sparta Prague players
Karlsruher SC players
RB Leipzig players
SC Paderborn 07 players
Holstein Kiel players
Chemnitzer FC players
Czech First League players
Austrian Football Bundesliga players
2. Bundesliga players
3. Liga players
Expatriate footballers in the Czech Republic
Expatriate footballers in Germany
Austrian expatriate sportspeople in the Czech Republic
Austrian expatriate sportspeople in Germany